Sunway City Ipoh (Jawi: بندر سونواي ايڤوه; Chinese: 双威打扪) is a township in Ipoh, Perak, Malaysia. It is located in Tambun. One of the famous attractions is Lost World of Tambun. 

Original development include the Alphine village (condominions), Garden Villars (semi-detached or cluster homes, attached on one side and back), Lakeside Villas (linked-houses), Country Homes (bungalows), Lakeside Mansion (bungalows), Montbleu Residence (terrace homes) & Serene Villa (cluster homes, and terrace homes).  Developer also built the Extreme Park, a golf driving range, the Banjaran Hotspring Retreat (hotel) as well as the Lost World Hotel right next to the Lost World of Tambun.

Ipoh
Sunway Group